UCHealth (University of Colorado Health) is a not-for-profit health care system, headquartered in Aurora, Colorado. The system includes hospitals and facilities throughout Colorado, along with affiliated hospitals in Wyoming and Nebraska. The system includes an academic medical center, UCHealth University of Colorado Hospital, which is closely affiliated with the University of Colorado School of Medicine. It is a joint operating company between the University of Colorado Hospital Authority (a state government agency) and Poudre Valley Health.

History 
The UCHealth system was founded in 2012 with the merger of the University of Colorado Hospital and the Poudre Valley Health System. The University of Colorado University Hospital was originally created on October 1, 1989, as a nonprofit corporation pursuant to an act of the Colorado General Assembly, but the act was declared unconstitutional by the Colorado Supreme Court in 1990. It was recreated in 1991 as the University of Colorado Hospital Authority as a government agency. University of Colorado Health was formed on January 31, 2012 (doing business as UCHealth since 2014), as a joint operating company between the authority and Poudre Valley Health (of Poudre Valley Hospital).

In August 2012, voters in Colorado Springs approved a special election measure to allow UCHealth to lease and operate Memorial Hospital.

In September 2016, UCHealth Broomfield Hospital opened. Located in Broomfield, Colorado, the hospital has 18 inpatient rooms and a 4-bed intensive care unit. 

In February 2017, the system retitled itself as UCHealth. In addition to a refurbished website and logo, it added an app for patients.

In August 2017, a new 51-bed hospital opened in Longmont, Colorado in Boulder County called UCHealth Longs Peak Hospital. 

In June 2019, the system opened a new hospital in Douglas County called UCHealth Highlands Ranch Hospital.   

In July 2019, the system opened a new hospital in Weld County called UCHealth Greeley Hospital. 

In January 2023, Parkview Medical Center in Pueblo joined the UCHealth network.

Awards and recognition 
UCHealth has been ranked as a top hospital in the United States on several occasions. In 2012, it was listed as a Thompson Reuters Top 100 Hospital. Between 2017 and 2021, UCHealth hospitals have been included numerous times on a list of America's Top Hospitals by U.S. News & World Report.

In 2018, the hospital achieved Level 1 Trauma Center Status. Also that year, the hospital received a Comprehensive Stroke Center designation.

In 2021, UCHealth was named the first-place winner in Healthcare Innovation's Innovator Awards program for 2021 for expanded their Virtual Health Center concept to facilitate a sepsis early-warning system with the goal of improving patient outcomes.

In August 2021, Forbes named UCHealth as the No. 1 employer in Colorado.

See also
UCHealth University of Colorado Hospital
UCHealth Poudre Valley Hospital
UCHealth Medical Center of the Rockies
UCHealth Memorial Hospital Central
UCHealth Memorial Hospital North
UCHealth Yampa Valley Medical Center
UCHealth Broomfield Hospital
UCHealth Grandview Hospital
UCHealth Greeley Hospital
UCHealth Highlands Ranch Hospital
UCHealth Longs Peak Hospital
UCHealth Pikes Peak Regional Hospital

References

External links
 

Health care companies based in Colorado
State agencies of Colorado